SW7 may refer to:

 EMD SW7, an American locomotive from 1949
 London SW7, a South Western postcode district in London
 South Kensington, a district in London
 The Smiler, a British roller coaster codenamed Secret Weapon 7
 Star Wars: The Force Awakens, a 2015 film also known as Star Wars Episode VII
 Tongkang LRT station, a rail station in Singapore